John Kachoyan is an Armenian-Australian director, writer, and dramaturg. He is a co-founder of Iron Bark, a theatre company in London, specialising in new Australian plays, and the former Creative Director of MKA: Theatre of New Writing, in Melbourne. Kachoyan has been a Director In Residence at Bell Shakespeare.

Education
Kachoyan was born and raised in Oatley, New South Wales. He attended Newington College (1995–2000) and graduated with BA (Media & Communications) from the University of Sydney, including a year studying at the University of Toronto. In 2004 he completed the National Institute of Dramatic Art Playwright's Studio and holds a Master of Arts (Advanced Theatre Practice) from the Royal Central School of Speech and Drama (RCSSD).

Career
Kachoyan spent 2007 to 2011 in London on a grant from the Australia Cultural Fund, where he co-founded IronBark – his work at IronBark involved productions and developments with leading Australian playwrights including Ben Ellis, Tom Holloway, Jack Hibberd, Vivienne Walshe and Melissa Bubnic and was Resident Assistant Director at the Finborough Theatre.
 
Returning to Australia he was appointed the 2012 Director in Residence for Bell Shakespeare – working extensively with the company's development arm Mind's Eye; including his adaptation of The Winter's Tale directed by John Bell in 2014 at the Sydney Opera House.

In 2013, Kachoyan was a Critical Stages Resident at the Seymour Centre, and was recently assistant director for Simon Phillips on Joanna Murray-Smith's new play Pennsylvania Avenue for Melbourne Theatre Company (2014)

Recent works

"Play For Australia" (2016/17), Director, Vessel Theatre
"The River" by  Jez Butterworth (2016), Director, Red Stitch Actors Theatre
"Elegy" (2016), Director, Lab Kelpie
"Lucky" (2015), Director & Dramaturgy, MKA: Theatre of New Writing
HYPRTXT Festival (2014), Festival Co-director, MKA: Theatre of New Writing
Tender Lands (2014), Director, Lyric Opera of Melbourne
Dogmeat (2014), director, MKA: Theatre of New Writing
The Winters Tale (2014) Dramaturg, Bell Shakespeare
Sweet Nothings (2013), Director, Australian Theatre for Young People + PantsGuys
Midsummer (2012), director, Red Stitch Actors Theatre

References

1982 births
Living people
People educated at Newington College
Australian people of Armenian descent
Australian theatre directors